Thermus is a genus of thermophilic bacteria. It is one of several bacteria belonging to the Deinococcota phylum. Thermus species can be distinguished from other genera in the family Thermaceae as well as all other bacteria by the presence of eight conserved signature indels (CSIs) found in proteins such as adenylate kinase and replicative DNA helicase as well as 14 conserved signature proteins (CSPs) that are exclusively shared by members of this genus.

Phylogeny

The currently accepted taxonomy is based on the List of Prokaryotic names with Standing in Nomenclature (LPSN)  and  the National Center for Biotechnology Information (NCBI).

Unassigned species:
 "T. anatoliensis" Kacagan et al. 2016
 "T. caldophilus" Taguchi et al. 1983
 "T. eggertssonii" Peters 2008
 "T. murrieta" Benner et al. 2006
 "T. nonproteolyticus" 1992
 "T. rehai" Lin et al. 2002
 "T. yunnanensis" Gong et al. 2005

See also
 Bacteria
 Biotechnology
 Thermophiles
 Geyser
 List of bacteria genera
 List of bacterial orders

References

Deinococcota
Thermophiles
Thermozoa
Organisms living on hydrothermal vents
Bacteria genera